Darío Antonio Veras (born March 13, 1973) is a former Major League Baseball player. A pitcher, Veras played for the San Diego Padres ( and ) and Boston Red Sox. Veras attempted a comeback with the Los Angeles Dodgers in 2007, but ultimately was cut from the team during spring training. Veras signed with the Vaqueros Laguna of the Mexican League and played for them during the 2010 season.

External links

1973 births
Águilas Cibaeñas players
Akron Aeros players
Boston Red Sox players
Buffalo Bisons (minor league) players
Central American and Caribbean Games gold medalists for the Dominican Republic
Dominican Republic expatriate baseball players in South Korea
Dominican Republic expatriate baseball players in the United States
Hyundai Unicorns players
KBO League pitchers
Kinston Indians players

Living people
Major League Baseball players from the Dominican Republic
Major League Baseball pitchers
Pawtucket Red Sox players
San Diego Padres players
Competitors at the 2010 Central American and Caribbean Games
Central American and Caribbean Games medalists in baseball
Bakersfield Dodgers players
Chinatrust Whales players
Dominican Republic expatriate baseball players in Taiwan
Dorados de Chihuahua players
Gulf Coast Royals players
Gigantes del Cibao players
Las Vegas Stars (baseball) players
Memphis Chicks players
Mobile BayBears players
Omaha Golden Spikes players
Potros de Tijuana players
Rancho Cucamonga Quakes players
Sultanes de Monterrey players
Vaqueros Laguna players
Vero Beach Dodgers players
Dominican Republic expatriate baseball players in Mexico